The European Regulators Group for Audiovisual Media Regulators (ERGA) is the advisory body consisting of the heads and high level representatives of the EU national regulatory authorities for audiovisual media services.

Its tasks are:
 	To advise and assist the Commission, in its work to ensure a consistent implementation in all Member States of the regulatory framework for audiovisual media services;
 	To assist and advise the Commission, as to any matter related to audiovisual media services within the Commission’s competence;
 	To provide for an exchange of experience and good practice as to the application of the regulatory framework for audiovisual media services;
 	To cooperate and provide its members with the information necessary for the application of the Audiovisual Media Services Directive.

Damir Hajduk, acting President of the Croatian Council for Electronic Media, and Luboš Kukliš, Chief Executive of the Council for Broadcasting and Retransmission of the Slovak Republic, are the Vice-Chairs of ERGA in 2017.

History 
ERGA was established by a decision of the European Commission of 3 February 2014. The Members of ERGA met for the first time in Brussels on 4 March 2014. It elected its chair and two vice-chairs and adopted its rules of procedure.
In 2016 ERGA published four expert reports on material and territorial jurisdiction, on the independence of national regulatory authorities, and on the protection of minors. These reports consisted of concrete advice to the European Commission regarding the revision of the directive for audiovisual media services. In its proposal to revise this directive of May 2016, the European Commission referred to ERGA's advice, stating: “ERGA has made a positive contribution towards consistent regulatory practice and has provided high level advice to the Commission on implementation matters. This calls for the formal recognition and reinforcement of its role in this Directive. The group should therefore be re-established by virtue of this Directive.”
The legislation process to adopt a revised AVMS Directive is still ongoing.

See also 
 ERGA Report on the Independence of National Regulatory Authorities
 ERGA Report on the Protection of Minors in a Converged Environment
 ERGA Report on Material Jurisdiction in a Converged Environment
 ERGA Report on Territorial Jurisdiction in a Converged Environment
 ERGA Report on the Provision of Greater Accessibility to Audiovisual Media Services for Person with Disabilities
 ERGA Opinion on AVMSD Proposal

References 
 Website ERGA
 Website EPRA
 Commission Decision on establishing the European Regulators Group for Audiovisual Media Regulators
 Directive for audiovisual media services
 Proposal for an updated Audiovisual Media Services Directive

Regulation in the European Union